Alfeiousa (before 1927: Βολάντζα - Volantza) is a village in Elis, Greece. 

It belongs to the municipal unit of Volakas, in the Municipality of Pyrgos. In 2011 its population was 1,037. The village is approximately 9 km southeast of Pyrgos, 8 km west of Olympia, 4 km northeast of Epitalio and 2 km south of Salmoni, at an altitude of 31 meters. 

Its residents are mainly engaged in agriculture, cultivating vines, olives and raisins.

Etymology 
In the past, the village was called Volantza, which probably derives from the Greek word βῶλαξ, meaning a lump of soil that is formed while plowing. Situated on the south bank of the river Alfeios, it was officially renamed to Alfeiousa in 1927, taking its name from the river.

Population

See also

List of settlements in Elis

External links
Alfeiousa at the GTP Travel Pages

References

Populated places in Elis